Chembur English High School is a school in Chembur. It is part of the Mahatma Education Society. The programs offered are from Standard I to X, and is affiliated with Maharashtra State Board of Secondary and Higher Secondary Education. In 1970, Dr. K. M. Vasudevan Pillai established the Chembur English High School under the aegis of the Mahatma Education Society. Dr. Pillai set about building an inclusive system of education, founded with the belief that knowledge was a privilege all deserve. The fees were kept to a bare minimum to ensure affordability for all. The initial years were fraught with struggle, Dr. Pillai served as a peon, clerk, and teacher in order to make ends meet. The school grew through fund-raising initiatives.

Mission 
To cater to the need of every child and to bring out the best in them through every possible means.

Events

Infrastructure

References

External links

Mahatma Education Society

High schools and secondary schools in Maharashtra
Schools in Chembur